1995–96 in Armenian football was the fourth season of independent football after the split-up from the Soviet Union. It was the first of two seasons in Armenia that were different from the others. Including the 1996–97 season these were the only winter competitions, while all other Armenian seasons were summer competitions. The Armenian Premier League for 1995–96 consisted of 12 teams of which the lowest ranked team would relegate to the Armenian First League. The eleventh ranked team would face the second ranked team from the First League in a promotion/relegation play-off.

Premier League
 Homenetmen Yerevan changed their name into FC Pyunik.
 Yerazank FC disbanded and yielded its place to another Artsakh Republic-based club from Stepanakert, FC Karabakh. Karabakh, much like Yerazank, were forced to relocate from Stepanakert to Yerevan due to the ongoing Nagorno-Karabakh conflict.
 FC Kotayk and Banants Kotayk merged, but the name of the merger was only limited to Kotayk Abovyan.
 Newly-founded FC Yerevan was unexpectedly promoted to replace Banants Kotayk.

League table

Promotion and relegation play-off

Top goalscorers

First League
Syunik Kapan returned to professional football and change their name to Kapan-81.

League table

Armenia Cup

References

External links
 RSSSF: Armenia 1995-96